Osaka Blazers Sakai is a men's professional volleyball team based in Sakai city, Osaka, Japan. It plays in the V.Premier League.

The club was founded in 1939 as part of the Kitakyushu, Fukuoka-based Yawata Steel athletic club which also included football club Yawata Steel F.C. In 1969 the volleyball section split and moved to Sakai.

Honours
Japan Volleyball League/V.League/V.Premier League
Champions (17): 1967-1968 1973-1974 1974-1975 1975-1976 1976-1977 1978-1979 1979-1980 1980-1981 1982-1983 1988-1989 1989-1990 1990-1991 1996-1997 1997-1998 2005-2006, 2010–11, 2012–13
Runners-up (4): 1994-95,1995–96, 2008–09 and 2009–10
Kurowashiki All Japan Volleyball Championship
Champions (14): 1952 1953 1957 1960 1967 1974 1975 1976 1977 1980 1984 1988 1989 1990
Emperor's Cup
Runner-up (2): 2007, 2021

Current roster 
{| class="wikitable plainrowheaders collapsible " style="text-align:center" 
! colspan="7"| Team roster – season 2022/2023|-
!style="width:5em; color:#000080; background-color:yellow"| 
!style="width:15em; color:#000080; background-color:yellow"| Player Name
!style="width:15em; color:#000080; background-color:yellow"| Date of birth
!style="width:10em; color:#000080; background-color:yellow"| Position
|-
| 1 ||align=left| Yoshihiko Matsumoto||align=right|||Middle Blocker
|-
| 2 ||align=left| Yuki Higuchi||align=right|||Outside Hitter
|-
| 3 ||align=left| Naoya Takano||align=right|||Outside Hitter
|-
| 5 ||align=left| Tomohiro Horie||align=right|||Libero
|-
| 7 ||align=left| Takashi Dekita (c)||align=right|||Middle Blocker
|-
| 9 ||align=left| Hiroshi Sakoda||align=right|||Outside Hitter
|-
| 11 ||align=left| Shigetome Hyuga||align=right|||Outside Hitter
|-
| 13 ||align=left| Sharone Vernon-Evans||align=right|||Opposite Hitter
|-
| 14 ||align=left| Shohei Yamaguchi||align=right|||Setter
|-
| 17 ||align=left| Akihiro Fukatsu||align=right|||Setter
|-
| 18 ||align=left| Rintaro Umemoto||align=right|||Middle Blocker
|-
| 20 ||align=left| Tomohiro Yamamoto||align=right|||Libero
|-
| 21 ||align=left| Yutaro Takemoto||align=right|||Middle Blocker
|-
| 22 ||align=left| Akahoshi Shinjo||align=right|||Setter
|-
| 23 ||align=left| Yukiya Uno||align=right|||Outside Hitter
|-
|colspan=4| Head coach:  Shinya Chiba
|}

League results
 Champion'''   Runner-up

References

External links
  
 V.league 

Japanese volleyball teams
Volleyball clubs established in 1939
Sports teams in Osaka Prefecture
1939 establishments in Japan